News TV Quick Response Team was a Philippine television news broadcasting show broadcast by GMA News TV. Originally anchored by Jiggy Manicad, it premiered on August 1, 2011. Emil Sumangil served as the final anchor. The show concluded on January 15, 2021.

Overview
The first news broadcasting program in the Philippine television in which the anchor is on the scene of the news. Except for some occasions where the anchor is deployed in a remote location for a few days, a reporter is assigned to substitute or co-anchor the newscast live from the studio.

On April 20, 2018, Manicad announced his departure from the program to run as a senator on the 2019 Philippine midterm elections under. Emil Sumangil served as his replacement.

In March 2020, the production was halted due to the enhanced community quarantine in Luzon caused by the COVID-19 pandemic. The show resumed its programming on September 21, 2020.

Anchors

 Jiggy Manicad 
 Emil Sumangil 

Substitute anchors
 Susan Enriquez
 Lala Roque

Accolades

References

External links
 

2011 Philippine television series debuts
2021 Philippine television series endings
Filipino-language television shows
Flagship evening news shows
GMA Integrated News and Public Affairs shows
GMA News TV original programming
Philippine television news shows
Television productions suspended due to the COVID-19 pandemic